Xplora was a Spanish TV channel owned by Atresmedia. The channel started broadcasting on 1 May 2012, replacing laSexta2 due its low ratings. On 5 May 2014, the channel ceased broadcasting.

Most of its programming were documentaries and reality television.

History

The channel ceased broadcasting on 5 May 2014 in DTT, as a consequence of a sentence by the Supreme Court that annulled the concessions for nine channels broadcasting in DTT, because their permissions for frequencies were granted without the required public consensus and assignments system according to the Audiovisual Law.

Since 6 May 2014 the channel broadcast only online via Atresplayer.

References

External links 
 
 Xplora live

Television channels and stations established in 2012
Television channels and stations disestablished in 2014
Atresmedia Televisión
2012 establishments in Spain
2014 disestablishments in Spain
Atresmedia channels